Gumerovo (Ğümär) is a rural locality (a village) in Tashtamaksky Selsoviet, Aurgazinsky District, Bashkortostan, Russia. The population was 85 as of 2010. There are 2 streets.

Geography 
Gumerovo is located 15 km southwest of Tolbazy (the district's administrative centre) by road. Tursugali is the nearest rural locality.

References 

Rural localities in Aurgazinsky District